The Revista Boliviana de Química (CODEN RBQUDX) is a Bolivian scientific journal in chemistry. It was founded in 1977 and is published by the Facultad de Ciencias Puras y Naturales Publicación de la Carrera de Química, Carrera de Química at the Campus Universitario Cota Cota, in La Paz. The journal was not published from 1980 to 1982.

The contents of the journal can be accessed via the Biblioteca Virtual Universitaria hosted at the Universidad Mayor de San Andrés (UMSA).

See also 
 Anales de Química

External links 
 Scielo Website
 Homepage of the journal
 Homepage of the Department of Chemistry at UMSA

Chemistry journals